Amelanchier × grandiflora, the serviceberry, is a small deciduous flowering tree or large shrub, a hybrid of garden origin between A. arborea and A. laevis, in the family Rosaceae. It produces white flowers and small red to purple edible fruits.

The Latin specific epithet grandiflora means "large-flowered".

Numerous cultivars have been developed for garden use, of which 'Princess Diana' 
and 'Robin Hill'
have gained the Royal Horticultural Society's Award of Garden Merit.

References

grandiflora
Plants described in 1920
Hybrid plants